Paulo Ricardo Alves da Silva  (born 17 August 1987), known as Paulo Ricardo or simply  Paulo , is a Brazilian retired footballer who played as a right back.

Career
He played for Santa Cruz on loan from Santos in the 2007 season.

Made professional debut, and only appearance this season in 4-3 away defeat to Botafogo on October 14, 2006.

Paulo played in Serie B with Sampaio Corrêa Futebol Clube.

References

External links
Futebol de Goyaz profile 

1987 births
Living people
Brazilian footballers
Association football defenders
Campeonato Brasileiro Série A players
Campeonato Brasileiro Série B players
Santos FC players
Santa Cruz Futebol Clube players
Esporte Clube Tigres do Brasil players
Legião Futebol Clube players
Brasiliense Futebol Clube players
Atlético Clube Goianiense players
Associação Atlética Anapolina players
Ceilândia Esporte Clube players
Santa Helena Esporte Clube players
Anápolis Futebol Clube players
Camboriú Futebol Clube players
Comercial Futebol Clube (Ribeirão Preto) players
Mogi Mirim Esporte Clube players
Sampaio Corrêa Futebol Clube players
Brasília Futebol Clube players
Grêmio Esportivo Juventus players
Sportspeople from Rio de Janeiro (state)